Aharji Jain Teerth is a historical pilgrimage site for Jainism located in Aharji, Madhya Pradesh, on the road from Tikamgarh to Chhatarpur.

Aharji Jain Teerth
Aharji group of temples were built during Chandella period. The main temple is famous for the beautiful colossal monumental image of Lord Shatinath from the. Bahubali temple is another important temple in the area. Aharji was a major Jain centre during the Chandella period. There is an inscription dated 1049 CE inscribed on bronze idols of Shantinath, Aranatha and Kunthunath. It was the last major temple to be built here in the Chandella period. Several other smaller temples were built here at the same time as the main temple.

Aharji Jain Teerth is famous for the miraculous  monolithic idol of Shantinath in Kayotsarga posture. The idol bears an inscription dated to 1180 CE (V.S. 1237).

Over 300 Jain images were found during excavation that were installed here from 954 CE to 1275 CE (VS 1011 to V.S. 1332), spanning the reigns of six Chandella rulers. The inscriptions give the names of 32 separate Jain communities that had built these temples, including Golapurva, Parwar, Khandelwal, Golalare, Jaiswal, etc.

The main temple is surrounded by several shrines and a museum.

Shantinath image inscription
The Shantinath image has a long inscription on it that mentions that two brothers, Jahad and Udaichandra, belonging to the Grahapati community, built the temple during the rule of Chandella ruler Paramardhi, who is well known as Raja Parmal in the popular ballad Alha-Khand. They were the descendants of the builders of the Sahasrakuta temple at Banpur, Lalitpur. The image was carved by a sculptor named Papat Trivedi. mentions that several Chandella inscriptions mentioning the Grahapati individuals have been found and that they were noted for their significance and donations.

Gallery

Location
The place is located in Taluka – Baldeogarh, District – Tikamgarh, Madhya Pradesh, about 25 km from Tikamgarh. The management committee is Shri Digamber Jain Siddha Kshetra Aharji Prabandhakarini Samiti, Nearby Cities include Tikamgarh and Chhatarpur

See also

 Alha-Khand
 Grahapati Kokkala inscription
 Jain temples of Khajuraho
 Jainism in Bundelkhand
 Tirtha

References

Citations

Sources

External links 

History of Madhya Pradesh
Tikamgarh
Jain temples in Madhya Pradesh
12th-century Jain temples
Tourist attractions in Tikamgarh district